Sibut, formerly Fort Sibut is the capital of Kémo, one of the 16 prefectures of the Central African Republic.

Sibut is located at the Northern end of the paved road coming from the capital, Bangui.  At Sibut, two major provincial roads split, one going North to Kaga Bandoro, and the other east towards Bomimi, a thriving agricultural village of 450 people,  from Sibut.

History
The settlement was originally named Krébédjé after the local Dekpa chief of the same name. The French arrived in 1895 and Krébédjé, and they officially recognised him as chief the next year. 

The town was renamed Fort Sibut in 1900 after Medical Major Adolphe Pierre Sibut, a deceased friend of colonial official Émile Gentil.

Formerly an important route of supply and communication between Fort de Possel on the Ubangi and the French settlements around Lake Chad, the river is now non-navigable even with small watercraft.

In 1952, American Baptist missionary Margery Benedict established a medical clinic and dispensary at Fort Sibut. In 1982, President Andre Kolingba traveled to Sibut to award her the Order of Gratitude for 30 years of service.

The present city has one high school which also serves as a landing strip, and a market.  Local food in street cafes include gozo (cassava) and peanut spinach sauce, along with various species of bushmeat.  Local drink includes palm wine and 33 beer. The Peace Corps had volunteers located in Sibut until the coup d'état of 1996.

On 29 December 2012 the city was captured by Seleka rebels. On 2 February 2014 Anti-balaka took control of the city following Seleka withdrawal. In May 2018 Central African Armed Forces were redeployed in the city with help of Russian instructors.

Climate 
Köppen-Geiger climate classification system classifies its climate as tropical wet and dry (Aw).

See also 
 List of cities in the Central African Republic
 Prefectures of the Central African Republic
 Lake Chad replenishment project
 Waterway

References 

Sub-prefectures of the Central African Republic
Populated places in the Central African Republic
Populated places in Kémo